John Welsh may refer to:

John Welsh of Ayr (1568–1622), religious leader
John Welsh of Irongray, religious leader
John Welsh (actor) (1904–1985), Irish actor
John Welsh (Australian footballer) (born 1938), Australian rules football player for Essendon
John Welsh (biologist) (1901–2002), American physiologist
John Welsh (bishop) (1856–1916), Bishop of Trinidad and Tobago, 1904–1916
John Welsh (diplomat) (1805–1886), American diplomat
John Welsh (English footballer) (born 1984), English football player for Grimsby Town
John Welsh (meteorologist) (1824–1859), FRS, Superintendent of Kew Observatory
Jon Welsh (born 1986), Scottish rugby union player

See also
Jonathan Welsh (disambiguation)
Jack Welsh (disambiguation)
John Walsh (disambiguation)
John Welch (disambiguation)